A list of American films released in 1906.

See also
 1905 in the United States

External links

1906 films at the Internet Movie Database

1906
Films
American
1900s in American cinema